(Main list of acronyms)


 B – (s) Bel – Boron

B0–9
 B10 – (i) Ben 10
 B10: AF – (i) Ben 10: Alien Force
 B10: UA – (i) Ben 10: Ultimate Alien
 B2B – (i) Business-to-business electronic commerce
 B2C – (i) Business-to-consumer electronic commerce
 B2E – (i) Business-to-employee electronic commerce
 B2M – Business to many

BA
 ba – (s) Bashkir language (ISO 639-1 code)
 Ba – (s) Barium
 BA –
(i) Bachelor of Arts
(s) Bahrain (FIPS 10-4 country code)
Bosnia and Herzegovina (ISO 3166 diagram)
(i) British Airways
British Army
Bank of America
 BAA – (i) British Airport Authority
 BAC – (a) Blood alcohol content
 British Aircraft Corporation
 BAD - (HBO) Boxing After Dark
 BADD – (a) Battlefield Awareness and Data Dissemination
 BAE – (p) BAE Systems (formerly British Aerospace, BAe)
 BAFTA – (a) British Academy of Film and Television Arts
 BAI – (i) Battlefield Air Interdiction
 bak – (s) Bashkir language (ISO 639-2 code)
 BALCO – (p) Bay Area Laboratory Co-operative
 bam – (s) Bambara language (ISO 639-2 code)
 BAM –
(i) Business Activity Monitoring
(s) Bosnia and Herzegovina convertible mark (ISO 4217 currency code)
 BAMC – (i) Brooke Army Medical Center
 Banesto – (p) Banco Español de Crédito (Spanish, "Spanish Credit Bank")
 BANG – (a) Bits, Atoms, Neurons, Genes
 BAO – (i) Battlefield Air Operations
 BAOR – (i) British Army Of the Rhine
 B[a]P – (p) Benzo[a]pyrene
 BAR
 (s) Barbados (IOC trigram, but not FIFA or ISO 3166)
 (a) British American Racing
 Browning Automatic Rifle
 Buy-American Restrictions
 BARD – (a) Binational Agricultural Research and Development fund (between the US and Israel)
 BARDA – (a) Biomedical Advanced Research and Development Authority
 BART – (a) Bay Area Rapid Transit
 BAS – (i) Battalion Aid Station
 BASE – (a) Building, Antenna, Span, Earth (parachute from)
 BASF – (i) Badische Anilin und Soda Fabrik (Baden Aniline and Soda Factory, a German chemicals company)
 BASIC – (a) Beginner's All-purpose Symbolic Instruction Code (acronym was added later, originally it was simply Basic)
 BAT – (a/i) Basic Aid Training
 (a) British American Tobacco, London, England
 BATF – (i) U.S. Bureau of Alcohol, Tobacco, and Firearms
 BATS –
(a) Behavior Analysis Training System
Bradley Advanced Training System
 BATTeRS – (a) Bisei Asteroid Tracking Telescope for Rapid Survey

BB
 BB
 (s) Barbados (ISO 3166 digram; FIPS 10-4 country code)
 (i) Boys' Brigade (Christian youth organization)
 Brigitte Bardot (actress)
 Bumblebee
 BBB
 (i) Better Business Bureau
 Big Black Cowboy
 Blood–brain barrier
 (p/i) BoerBurgerBeweging (Dutch, "Farmer–Citizen Movement"; Dutch political party)
 BBC
 (i) Breeding Bird Census
 British Broadcasting Corporation
 (i) Bumper to Back of Cab (trucking measurement)
 BBCOR – (i) Bat-ball coefficient of restitution (standard used for non-wood bats used in US college baseball)
 BBD
 (s) Barbadian dollar (ISO 4217 currency code)
 (a) Bowel Bladder Dysfunction
 BBL
 (i) Be Back Later
 Bird Banding Laboratory
 British Basketball League
 BBN – (i) Bolt, Beranek and Newman
 BBOL – Blessing Ball of Light
 BBQ – (s) Barbecue
 BBS
 (i) Breeding Bird Survey (North America)
 Brigade/Battalion Battle Simulation
 Bulletin Board System
 BBSRC – (i) U.K. Biotechnology and Biological Sciences Research Council
 BBVA – (i) Banco Bilbao Vizcaya Argentaria (Spanish bank)
 BBYO – B'nai B'rith Youth Organization

BC
 BC
 (i) Before Christ
 Blind Copy (in emailers)
 Boston College
 (s) Botswana (FIPS 10-4 country code; from Bechuanaland)
 British Columbia (postal symbol)
 BCA
 (i) Bachelor of Computer Application
 Black Coaches & Administrators
 BCC – (i) Blind Carbon Copy
 BCCI
 (i) Bank of Credit and Commerce International
 Board of Control for Cricket in India
 BCD – (i) Binary-Coded Decimal
 BCE
 (i) Banque centrale européenne (French, "European Central Bank")
 Battlefield Co-ordination Element
 BC Electric, a former name for BC Hydro
 Before Common Era
 BCER – (i) British Columbia Electric Railway
 BCFG – (s) Patchy Fog (METAR Code)
 BCIS (fratricide avoidance system) – (i) Battlefield Combat Identification System
 BCLL – (a) Bibliography of Celtic Latin Literature
 BCPL – (i) Basic Combined Programming Language (progenitor of C)
 BCS
 (i) Bachelor of Computer Science
 Bardeen, Cooper, and Schrieffer superconduction theory
 Bowl Championship Series (US college football)
 BCT – (i) Brigade Combat Team

BD
 BD
 (s) Bangladesh (ISO 3166 digram)
 Bermuda (FIPS 10-4 territory code)
 BDA – (i) British Dental Association
 BDD
 (i) Body Dysmorphic Disorder
 British Defence Doctrine
 Bde – (s) Brigade
 BDFL – (i) Benevolent Dictator For Life
 BDI – (s) Burundi (ISO 3166 trigram)
 BDNF – (i) Brain-Derived Neurotrophic Factor
 BDO – (i) Battle Dress Overgarment
 BDOS – (a) Basic Disk Operating System; part of CP/M
 BDS
 (i) – Bachelor of Dental Surgery
 Boycott, Divestment and Sanctions, a movement advocating various boycotts of Israel in the context of the Arab–Israeli conflict
 BDSM – (i) Bondage and Discipline, Domination and Submission, Sadism and Masochism
 BDT
 (s) Bangladeshi taka (ISO 4217 currency code)
 (i) Bureau de développement des télécommunications (Telecommunication Development Bureau, became ITU-D)
 BDU – (i) Battle-Dress Uniform

BE
 be – (s) Belarusian language (ISO 639-1 code)
 Be – (s) Beryllium
 BE – (s) Belgium (FIPS 10-4 country code; ISO 3166 digram)
 BEA
 (i) Banque extérieure d'Algérie
 British European Airways (ancestor of British Airways)
 British Electricity Authority
 bel – (s) Belarusian language (ISO 639-2 code)
 BEL – (s) Belgium (ISO 3166 trigram)
 BEM – (i) British Empire Medal – Bug-Eyed Monster
 ben – (s) Bengali language (ISO 639-2 code)
 BEN – (s) Benin (ISO 3166 trigram)
 BEO – (i) Banquet Event Order
 BERC – (a) Business Environmental Resource Center
 BER – (i) Bit Error Rate
 BES
 (i) Budget Estimate Submission
 (s) Caribbean Netherlands (ISO 3166 trigram; from the entity's alternate name of Bonaire, Sint Eustatius and Saba)
 BESS – (i) Business, Education, and Social Sciences
 BET – (a/i) Black Entertainment Television
 BETS – (a) Bradley Embedded Training System
 BEV
 (i) Battery electric vehicle
 Black English Vernacular, a type of English spoken by many African Americans
 Bundesamt für Eich- und Vermessungswesen (German: "Federal Office of Metrology and Surveying"), Austrian government agency

BF
 BF – (s) The Bahamas (FIPS 10-4 country code) – Burkina Faso (ISO 3166 digram)
 b/f – (p) before
 BFA – (s) Burkina Faso (ISO 3166 trigram)
 BfArM – (i) Bundesinstitut für Arzneimittel und Medizinprodukte, German governmental institute for drugs and medical devices
 BFF – (i) Best Friends Forever
 BFI – (a) British Film Institute
 BFR – (a) Biennial flight review
 BFR – (i) Brominated Flame Retardant
 BFS – (s) Belfast International Airport (IATA airport code)
 BFSA – (i) Blue Force Situation Awareness
 BFT – (i) Blue Force Tracking
 BFX – (s) Bioinformatics

BG
 bg – (s) Bulgarian language (ISO 639-1 code)
 BG – (s) Bangladesh (FIPS 10-4 country code) –  (i) Battle Group – Body Guard – (s) Brigadier General – (s) Bulgaria (ISO 3166 digram)
 BGA – (i) Ball Grid Array – Brandy and Ginger Ale (alcoholic beverage)
 BGD – (s) Bangladesh (ISO 3166 trigram)
 BGN – (i) U.S. Board on Geographic Names – (s) Bulgarian lev (ISO 4217 currency code)
 BGR – (s) Bulgaria (ISO 3166 trigram)
 BGS – (i) Bristol Grammar School – British Geographical Survey
 BGWG – (p) Battle Group Wargame (military simulation; "big wig")

BH
 bh – (s) Bihari languages (ISO 639-1 code)
 Bh – (s) Bohrium
 BH
 (s) Bahrain (ISO 3166 digram)
 Belize (FIPS 10-4 country code)
 BHD – (s) Bahraini dinar (ISO 4217 currency code)
 BHR – (s) Bahrain (ISO 3166 trigram)
 BHS
 (i) British Home Stores
 (s) The Bahamas (ISO 3166 trigram)

BI
 bi – (s) Bislami language (ISO 639-1 code)
 Bi – (s) Bismuth
 BI – (s) Burundi (ISO 3166 digram)
 BIAP – (a) Baghdad International Airport – (p) Biafran pound
 BICS – (i/a) Battlefield Information and Communication System
 BID – (i) bis in die (Latin, "twice a day")
 BIDST – (i) British Institute of Dental and Surgical Technologists
 BIF – (s) Burundian franc (ISO 4217 currency code)
 bih – (s) Bihari languages (ISO 639-2 code)
 BIH – (s) Bosnia and Herzegovina (ISO 3166 trigram)
 BIOS – (a) Basic Input/Output System – British Institute of Organ Studies
 BIP – (a) Battlefield Interoperability Programme (ancestor of MIP) – Broadcast incremental power algorithm
 bis – (s) Bislami language (ISO 639-2 code)
 BISEPS – (a) Battlefield Identification System Environment Performance Simulation
 BIST – (a) Built-In Self-Test
 BIT – (a) Bilateral Investment Treaty – Built-In Test
 BITE – (a) Built-In Test Equipment

BJ
 BJ – (s) Benin (ISO 3166 digram) – (i) Blowjob (oral sex)
 BJJ – (i) Brazilian Jiu-Jitsu
 BJP – (i) Bharatiya Janata Party (Indian People's Party)
 BJT – (i) Bipolar Junction Transistor

BK
 Bk – (s) Berkelium
 BK
 (i) Burger King
 (p) Bankrupt (most often seen as "gone BK")
 (s) Bosnia and Herzegovina (FIPS 10-4 country code)
 BKN – (s) Broken Sky (METAR Code)

BL
 BL
 (s) Bolivia (FIPS 10-4 country code)
 (i) British Leyland
 BLCSE – (i) Battle Laboratory Constructive Simulation Environment
 BLDU – (s) Blowing Dust (METAR Code)
 BLEVE – (a) Boiling Liquid Expanding Vapour Explosion ("blevy")
 BLK – (i) Basket Liga Kobiet (Polish, "Women's Basketball League")
 BLOB – (p) Binary Large OBject
 BLR – (s) Belarus (ISO 3166 trigram)
 BLSA – (s) Blowing Sand (METAR Code)
 BLRSI – Battle Lab Reconfigurable Simulator (U.S. Army)
 BLSN – (s) Blowing Snow (METAR Code)
 BLT – (i) Bacon Lettuce Tomato (sandwich)
 BLUFOR – (p) Blue Force(s) (military)
 BLUI – (a/i) Body Language User Interface ("blooie")
 BLZ – (s) Belize (ISO 3166 trigram)

BM
 bm – (s) Bambara language (ISO 639-1 code)
 BM – (i) Battle Management – (s) Bermuda (ISO 3166 digram) – Myanmar (FIPS 10-4 country code; from Burma)
 BMA – (i) British Medical Association
 BMCC – (i) Borough of Manhattan Community College
 BMD –  (i) Ballistic Missile Defence – (s) Bermudian dollar (ISO 4217 currency code) – (i) Boyevaya Mashina Desanta (Russian Боевая Машина Десанта, "Combat Vehicle Airborne") † – British Military Doctrine
 BMDG – (i) British Military Doctrine Group
 BMDO – (i) (U.S.) Ballistic Missile Defense Organization ("bim-do")
 BME – (p) Biomedical Engineering – (i) Black and Minority Ethnic group – Body Modification E-zine
 BMEWS – (a/i) Ballistic Missile Early Warning System ("bee-mews")
 BMI – (i) Body Mass Index – Broadcast Music Incorporated - British Midland International
 BMG – (i) Bertelsmann Music Group
 BML – (i) Battle Management Language
 BMNT – (i) Begin Morning Nautical Twilight
 BMP – (i) Boyevaya Mashina Pekhoti (Russian Боевая Машина Пехоты, "Combat Vehicle for the Infantry") †
 BMR – (i) Basal metabolic rate – Bronirovannaya Mashina Razminirovaniya (Russian Бронированная Машина Разминирования, "Armoured Vehicle for Mine-Clearing") †
 BMU – (s) Bermuda (ISO 3166 trigram)
 BMW – (i) Bayerische Motoren Werke (German, "Bavarian Motor Works")
 BMX – (i) Bicycle/Bike Moto (r) Cross

BN
 bn – (s) Bengali language (ISO 639-1 code)
 Bn – (s) Battalion
 BN 
 (s) Brunei (ISO 3166 digram; FIPS 10-4 country code)
 (i) Barisan Nasional (Malaysia)
 BND – (s) Brunei dollar (ISO 4217 currency code)
 BnF – (i) Bibliothèque nationale de France (French, "National Library of France")
 BNF
 (i) Backus–Naur form (computing)
 British National Formulary
 BNICE – (a) Biological, Nuclear, Incendiary, Chemical, and Explosive Agents
 BNP
 (i) British National Party
 Banque Nationale de Paris, a predecessor to today's BNP Paribas
 BNS – (i) Bank of Nova Scotia
 BNSF – (i/s) Burlington Northern Santa Fe (also AAR reporting mark)

BO
 bo – (s) Tibetan language (ISO 639-1 code)
 BO
 (i) Back Orifice
 (s) Belarus (FIPS 10-4 country code)
 (i) Biarritz Olympique (French rugby union club)
 (s) Bolivia (ISO 3166 digram)
 (i) Body odor
 BO2k – (i) Back Orifice 2000
 BOAC – (i) British Overseas Airways Corporation (predecessor of British Airways)
 BoAML – Bank of America Merrill Lynch
 BOAT – (p) Byway Open to All Traffic (pronounced as two syllables, "Bo-At")
 BOB – (s) boliviano (ISO 4217 currency code) - Bank One Ballpark
 BOBFOC – (a) Body Off Baywatch, Face Off Crimewatch (description)
 BOBFOK – (a) Body of Barbie, face of Ken (description)
 BOC
 (i) British Orthodontic Society
 BOC
 BÖC – (i) Blue Öyster Cult
 bod – (s) Tibetan language (ISO 639-2 code)
 BOD – (i) Biochemical Oxygen Demand
 BODMAS – (a) Brackets, Orders, Division, Multiplication, Addition, Subtraction
 BOFH – (i) Bastard Operator From Hell
 BOGA – (a) Bend Over and Grab Ankles
 BOGOF – (a) Buy One, Get One Free
 BOGSAT – (a) Bunch Of Guys Sitting Around a Table
 BOHICA – (a) Bend Over Here It Comes Again
 BOI
 (i) Balance Of Investment
 Basis Of Issue
 BOL – (s) Bolivia (ISO 3166 trigram)
 BOM
 (a) Base Object Model
 Bill Of Materials
 Block of the Month quilting term
 Business opportunity meeting
 BOP – (i) Balance of Payments
 BOPB – (i) Biarritz Olympique Pays Basque (the complete name of the rugby club)
 BOPD – (i) Barrel of Oil Per Day
 BOQ
 (i) Bill Of Quotations
 Bachelor Officers' Quarters
 Bank of Queensland
 bos – (s) Bosnian language (ISO 639-2 code)
 BOS – (i) Battlefield Operating System
 BOT
 (i) Balance of Trade
 (s) Botswana (IOC and FIFA trigram, but not ISO 3166)
 (i) Build Operate Transfer
 (i) Bank of Thailand

BP
 BP
 (i) Battle Position
 British Petroleum (today, BP does not officially stand for anything)
 (s) Solomon Islands (FIPS 10-4 country code; from British Protectorate of the Solomon Islands)
 Bp – (i) Bishop
 BPD – (i) Bipolar Personality Disorder
 BPM – (i) Beats Per Minute
 BPMo – (i) Business Process Mobility
 BPV
 (i) Battlefield Planning Visualization
 Bovine papillomavirus

BQ
 BQ
 (s) British Antarctic Territory (former ISO 3166 digram; merged with AQ in 1979)
 Caribbean Netherlands (current ISO 3166 digram; based on the entity's alternate name of Bonaire, Sint Eustatius and Saba)
 Navassa Island (FIPS 10-4 territory code)

BR
 br – (s) Breton language (ISO 639-1 code)
 Br – (s) Bromine
 Br – "Best regards" used in valediction
 BR
 (s) Brazil (ISO 3166 digram; FIPS 10-4 country code) – Bihar (Indian state code)
 (i) British Rail
 Break Ranks (marching band term)
 BRA – (s) Brazil (ISO 3166 trigram)
 BRAG – (a) Bicycle Ride Across Georgia
 BRASS – Breathe, Relax, Aim, Sight, Squeeze (Acronym for using a rifle)
 BRB
 (s) Barbados (ISO 3166 trigram)
 (i) "Be Right Back" (Internet chat abbreviation)
 BRDM – (i) Boyevaya Razvedyvatelnaya Dosornaya Mashina (Russian Боевая Разведывательная Дозорная Машина, "Combat Reconnaissance Patrol Vehicle") †
 bre – (s) Breton language (ISO 639-2 code)
 BRFSS – (p) Behavioral Risk Factor Surveillance System ("burf-us", a CDC health survey covering the U.S. and its territories)
 BRI
 (i) Bathroom Readers Institute (publishers of series of "Uncle John's Bathroom Readers" books)
 Belt and Road Initiative (China-led Asian transport initiative)
 BRIC – (a) Brazil, Russia, India and China
 BRICS – (a) Brazil, Russia, India, China and South Africa
 BRIMS – (a) Behavior Representation In Modeling and Simulation (conference)
 BRL – (s) Brazilian real (ISO 4217 currency code)
 BRM – (i) Boyevaya Razvedyvatelnaya Mashina (Russian Боевая Разведывательная Машина, "Combat Reconnaissance Vehicle") †
 BRN
 (s) Bahrain (IOC trigram, but not FIFA or ISO 3166)
 (s) Brunei (ISO 3166 trigram)
 BRSB – (i) Battlefield Reasoning System Brianna
 BRU – (s) Brunei (IOC and FIFA trigram, but not ISO 3166)

BS
 bs – (s) Bosnian language (ISO 639-1 code)
 BS
 (s) The Bahamas (ISO 3166 digram)
 Bassas da India (FIPS 10-4 territory code)
 Bachelor of Science degree
 British subject
 Bullshit
 BSA
 (i) Birmingham Small Arms (motorcycles company)
 Boy Scouts of America
 Brigade Support Area
 BSatCoP – Benjamin Sniddlegrass and the Cauldron of Penguins
 BSD
 (s) Bahamian dollar (ISO 4217 currency code)
 (i) Berkeley Software Distribution (distinct from BSoD)
 BSE – (i) Bovine Spongiform Encephalopathy, better known as mad cow disease
 BSE – (i) Buku Sekolah Elektronik (screw thread),
 BSF – (i) British Standard Fine (screw thread)
 BSL
 (i) Basketbol Süper Ligi (Turkish, "Basketball Super League"; top Turkish men's league)
 British Sign Language
 BSMB – (i) British Society for Matrix Biology
 BSN
 Baloncesto Superior Nacional (Spanish, "National Superior Basketball"; top Puerto Rican league)
 Bank Simpanan Nasional (Malay, "National Savings Bank"; government-owned Malaysian bank)
 BSNL 
 Bharat Sanchar Nigam Limited
 (i) Bachelor of Science in Nursing
 BSoD – (i) Blue Screen of Death (distinct from BSD)
 BSP
 (i) Between-Show Promotion
 Binary Space Partitioning
 Board Support Package
 British Standard Pipe (screw thread)
 (p) Business-sponsored
 Bone sialoprotein
 BSS
 Block Starting with Symbol – see .bss
 Boxed Set Syndrome – where one starts watching a boxed set of DVDs and just can't stop until you've watched them all
 BST
 (i) Binary search tree
 Blended Sales Tax
 (p) Bovine somatotropin
 (i) British Summer Time
 BSW – (i) British Standard Whitworth (screw thread)
 BSW - Blind Spot Warning, see Blind spot monitor
 BSX – (i) Bendigo Stock Exchange

BT
 Bt
 (i) Baronet
 Bacillus thuringiensis
 BT
 (i) Baal teshuva (Hebrew, "master of return") – used to describe a Jew who adopts Orthodox Judaism as an adult
 Bathythermograph
 (s) Bhutan (FIPS 10-4 country code; ISO 3166 digram)
 (i) BitTorrent
 British Telecom, the former name of the company now known as BT Group
 BTDT – (i) Been There, Done That
 Bti – (i) Bacillus thuringiensis israelensis
 BTID – (i) Battlefield Target Identification Device
 BTIS – (i) Battlefield Target Identification System
 BTN
 (s) Bhutan (ISO 3166 trigram)
 Bhutanese ngultrum (ISO 4217 currency code)
 BTO – (i) Built To Order
 BTP – (i) British Transport Police
 BTR – (i) Bronetransporter (БТР = Бронетранспортер "(Heavy) Armoured (Personnel) Transporter") †
 BTS
 (p) Bangtan Sonyeondan (Korean, 방탄소년단; literally "Bulletproof Boy Scouts"), expansion of the name of South Korean band BTS
 (i) Base transceiver station
 Beyond the Scene, promoted by the band BTS as an alternate expansion of its initialism
 Build to stock (production approach)
 Bureau of Transportation Statistics, U.S. federal agency
 Business Training Systems, original name of the Swedish professional services firm BTS Group
 BTU – (i) British Thermal Unit
 BTW – (s) By The Way

BU
 BU – (s)
Bulgaria (FIPS 10-4 country code) –
Burma (ISO 3166 digram; obsolete since 1989)
 BUAV – (i) British Union for the Abolition of Vivisection
 BUG-E – (a) Battlefield Universal Gateway Equipment ("buggy")
 bul – (s) Bulgarian language (ISO 639-2 code)
 BUL – (s) Bulgaria (IOC and FIFA trigram, but not ISO 3166)
 BUNO or BuNo – (p) Bureau Number (aircraft serial number)
 BUR – (s) Burma (ISO 3166 trigram; obsolete since 1989)

BV
 BV – (i)
Background Vocals –
Battlefield Visualization – (s)
Bouvet Island (ISO 3166 digram; FIPS 10-4 territory code)
 BVB
 (p) Ballspielverein Borussia 09 e.V. Dortmund, the full German name of the football club known in English as Borussia Dortmund
 Bursa de Valori București (Romanian for Bucharest Stock Exchange)
 BVD – (i) Bradley, Voorhees & Day (underwear manufacturer)
 BVR – (i) Beyond Visual Range
 BVT – (s) Bouvet Island (ISO 3166 trigram)

BW
 B&W – (i) Babcock & Wilcox – Black and White – Bowers & Wilkins
 BW – (s) Bring Wedges (ISO digram)
 BW – (s) Botswana (ISO 3166 digram)
 BWA – (s) Botswana (ISO 3166 trigram)
 BWARS – (a) Bees, Wasps & Ants Recording Society
 BWC – (p) Biological and Toxin Weapons Convention
 BWP – (s) Botswana pula (ISO 4217 currency code)
 BWR – (i) Boiling-Water Reactor

BX
 BX – (p) Base eXchange – (s)

BY
 BY – (s)
Burundi (FIPS 10-4 country code) –
Belarus (ISO 3166 digram)
 BYOB – (i) Bring Your Own Bottle (or  "beer", "beverage", or "booze") (multiple, but similar, meanings)
 BYOC – (i) Bring Your Own Computer (play on BYOB)
 BYOF – (i) Bring Your Own Flask
 BYR – (s) Belarusian rubel (ISO 4217 currency code)
 BYS – (s) Byelorussian Soviet Socialist Republic (ISO 3166 trigram; obsolete since 1992)
 BYU – (i) Brigham Young University

BZ
 BZ – (s) Belize (ISO 3166 digram)
 BZD – (s) Belize dollar (ISO 4217 currency code)
 BZP – (p) Benzylpiperazine

References

Acronyms B